Michael Kelland John Hutchence (22 January 1960 – 22 November 1997) was an Australian singer, songwriter and actor. Hutchence co-founded the rock band INXS, which sold over 75 million records worldwide and was inducted into the ARIA Hall of Fame in 2001. He was the lead singer and lyricist of INXS from 1977 until his death.

Hutchence was a member of the short-lived pop rock group Max Q. He also recorded some solo material and acted in feature films, including Dogs in Space (1986), Frankenstein Unbound (1990), and Limp (1999).

Hutchence had a string of love affairs with prominent actresses, models and singers, and his private life was often reported in the Australian and international press. In July 1996, Hutchence and English television presenter Paula Yates had a daughter.

On the morning of 22 November 1997, Hutchence was found dead at his hotel room in Sydney. His death was reported by the New South Wales Coroner to be the result of suicide by hanging.

Early life
Hutchence was born on 22 January 1960, in Crows Nest, Sydney, to businessman Kelland "Kell" Frank Hutchence and make-up artist Patricia Glassop. His paternal grandparents were English and settled in Sydney in 1922. Michael joined elder half-sister Tina; both siblings were of Irish ancestry from their mother's side, as Patricia's father was from County Cork in Ireland.

Following Kell's business interests, the Hutchence family moved to Brisbane (where younger brother Rhett was born) and later to Hong Kong. During the early years in Hong Kong, both boys attended Glenealy Junior School on Hong Kong Island and Beacon Hill School in Kowloon Tong. While in Hong Kong, Michael showed promise as a swimmer before breaking his arm badly. He then began to show interest in poetry and performed his first song in a local toy store commercial. Michael attended King George V School during his early teens.

The family returned to Sydney in 1972, buying a house in Belrose near the Northern Beaches. Hutchence attended Davidson High School, where he met and befriended Andrew Farriss. Around this time, Hutchence and Farriss spent a lot of time jamming in the garage with Andrew's brothers. Farriss then convinced Hutchence to join his band, Doctor Dolphin, alongside classmates Kent Kerny and Neil Sanders. Bass guitarist Garry Beers and drummer Geoff Kennelly from nearby Forest High School filled out the line-up. Hutchence's parents separated when he was 15; for a short time in 1976, he lived with his mother and half-sister Tina in California. Hutchence later returned to Sydney with his mother.

In 1977, a new band, the Farriss Brothers, was formed with Tim Farriss on lead guitar, his younger brother Andrew as keyboardist, and youngest brother Jon on drums. Andrew brought Hutchence on board as a vocalist and Beers on bass guitar, and Tim brought in his former bandmate Kirk Pengilly to play guitar and saxophone. The band made their debut on 16 August 1977 at Whale Beach, 40 km (25 mi) north of Sydney.

Career

Early career
Hutchence, the Farriss brothers, Kerny, Sanders, Beers and Kennelly briefly performed as The Vegetables, singing "We Are the Vegetables". Ten months later, they returned to Sydney and recorded a set of demos. The Farriss Brothers regularly supported hard rockers Midnight Oil on the pub rock circuit, and were renamed as INXS in 1979. Their first performance under the new name was on 1 September at the Oceanview Hotel in Toukley. In May 1980, the group released their first single, "Simple Simon"/"We Are the Vegetables" which was followed by the debut album INXS in October. Their first Top 40 Australian hit on the Kent Music Report Singles Chart, "Just Keep Walking", was released in September 1980.

Hutchence became the main spokesman for the band. He co-wrote almost all of INXS's songs with Andrew Farriss.

According to Hutchence, most of the songs on the band's second album, Underneath the Colours, were written within a fairly short space of time: "Most bands shudder at the prospect of having 20 years to write their first album and four days to write their second. For us, though, it was good. It left less room for us to go off on all sorts of tangents". Soon after recording sessions for Underneath the Colours – produced by Richard Clapton – had finished, band members started work on outside projects. Hutchence recorded "Speed Kills", written by Don Walker of hard rockers Cold Chisel, for the Freedom (1982) film soundtrack, directed by Scott Hicks. It was Hutchence's first solo single and was released by WEA in early 1982.

Stardom and acting career
In March 1985, after Hutchence and INXS recorded their album The Swing (1984), WEA released the Australian version of Dekadance, as a limited edition cassette only EP of six tracks including remixes from the album. The cassette also included a cover version of Nancy Sinatra and Lee Hazlewood's hit "Jackson", which Hutchence sang as a duet with Jenny Morris, a backing singer for The Swing sessions. The EP reached No 2 on the Kent Music Report Albums Chart. Hutchence provided vocals for new wave band Beargarden's 1985 single release.

On 19 May, INXS won seven awards at the 1984 Countdown Music and Video Awards ceremony, including 'Best Songwriter' for Hutchence and Andrew, and 'Most Popular Male' for Hutchence. They performed "Burn for You", dressed in Akubras (a brand of hats) and Drizabones (a brand of outdoor coats/oilskin jackets) followed by Hutchence and Morris singing "Jackson" to close.

In 1986, Hutchence played Sam, the lead male role, in the Australian film Dogs in Space, directed by long-time INXS music video collaborator Richard Lowenstein. Sam's girlfriend, Anna, was portrayed by Saskia Post as a "fragile peroxide blonde in op-shop clothes". Hutchence provided four songs on the film's soundtrack. Also working on the film and its soundtrack, as music director, was Ollie Olsen (ex-Whirlywirld).

Late in 1986, before commencing work on a new INXS album and while supposedly taking an eight-month break, the band's management decided to stage the Australian Made tour as a series of major outdoor concerts across the country. The roster featured INXS, Jimmy Barnes (Cold Chisel), Models, Divinyls, Mental as Anything, The Triffids and I'm Talking. To promote the tour, Hutchence and Barnes shared vocals on The Easybeats cover "Good Times" and "Laying Down the Law", which Barnes cowrote with Beers, Andrew Farriss, Jon Farriss, Hutchence and Pengilly. "Good Times" was used as the theme for the concert series of 1986–1987. It peaked at No. 2 on the Australian charts, and months later was featured in the Joel Schumacher film The Lost Boys and its soundtrack, allowing it to peak at No. 47 in the U.S. on 1 August 1987. Divinyls' lead singer Chrissy Amphlett enjoyed the tour and reconnected with Hutchence, stating that "[he] was a sweet man, who said in one interview that he wanted me to have his baby."

In 1987, Hutchence provided vocals for Richard Clapton's album Glory Road, which was produced by Jon Farriss.

INXS released Kick in October 1987, and the album provided the band with worldwide popularity. Kick peaked at No. 1 in Australia, No. 3 on the US Billboard 200, No. 9 in UK, and No. 15 in Austria. The band's most successful studio album, Kick has been certified six times platinum by the RIAA and spawned four US top 10 singles ("New Sensation", "Never Tear Us Apart", "Devil Inside" and "Need You Tonight", the last of which reached the top of the US Billboard singles charts). According to 1001 Songs: The Great Songs of All Time and the Artists, Stories and Secrets Behind Them, the single "Need You Tonight" is not lyrically complex; it is Hutchence's performance where "he sings in kittenish whisper, gently drawing back with the incredible lust of a tiger hunting in the night" that makes the song "as sexy and funky as any white rock group has ever been". In September 1988, the band swept the MTV Video Music Awards with the video for "Need You Tonight/Mediate" winning in five categories.

In 1989, Hutchence collaborated further with Olsen for the Max Q project, and was joined by members of Olsen's previous groups including Whirlywirld, No and Orchestra of Skin and Bone. They released a self-titled album and three singles, "Way of the World", "Sometimes" and "Monday Night by Satellite". Max Q disbanded in 1990. Max Q showed Hutchence exploring the darker side of his music and, with Olsen, he created "one of the most innovative dance music albums of the decade". Hutchence wrote most of the music and provided "an extraordinary performance ... it was one of the most significant statements Hutchence was to make". In 1990, Hutchence portrayed nineteenth-century Romantic poet Percy Shelley in Roger Corman's film version of Frankenstein Unbound, which was based on a science fiction time travel story of the same name written by Brian Aldiss.

In 1990, INXS released X, which spawned more international hits such as "Suicide Blonde" and "Disappear" (both Top 10 in the US). "Suicide Blonde" peaked at No. 2 in Australia and No. 11 in the UK. Hutchence, with Andrew Farriss, wrote the song after Hutchence's then-girlfriend, Kylie Minogue, used the phrase "suicide blonde" to describe her look during her 1989 film, The Delinquents; the film depicted Minogue in a platinum blonde wig. Hutchence won the 'Best International Artist' at the 1991 BRIT Awards with INXS winning the related group award. Hutchence provided vocals for pub rockers Noiseworks' album, Love Versus Money (1991).

Welcome to Wherever You Are was released by INXS in August 1992. It received good critical reviews and went to No. 1 in the UK.

Later career
Hutchence and INXS faced reduced commercial success with Full Moon, Dirty Hearts, especially in the U.S. The band took time off to rest and be with their families, while Hutchence remained in the public eye through his romances. He commenced work on a self-titled solo album in the mid-1990s.

After a period of inactivity and releases that received lukewarm reviews, INXS recorded the band's 10th official album, Elegantly Wasted, in 1996.

Artistry
Hutchence was a baritone. His vocal range spanned from the bass B1 to the high tenor F#5. In 2013, News.com.au ranked Hutchence fourth in a list of the 15 greatest Australian singers of all time. Billboard described Hutchence as "charismatic," with a "seductive purr and [a] lithe, magnetic stage presence." Paul Donoughue of ABC.net.au wrote that Hutchence had "a phenomenal voice — moody, sexual, and dynamic, able to shift effortlessly from fragile to cocksure." Reviewing an INXS concert, Dave Simpson of The Guardian wrote, "Watching Hutchence, hair flailing, crotch thrusting, a mischievous smile forever creeping across his leathery face, I realised that here was a man born to be onstage, living and loving every minute, an explosion of sexual energy". Hutchence biographer Toby Creswell asserted that "Hutchence was, without question, one of the truly great frontmen — he expressed the music in a dynamic way that few others could."

Personal life
According to People, Hutchence's "public brawls and onetime open drug use led London tabloids to dub him the 'wild man of rock.'" He was romantically linked to Kylie Minogue, Belinda Carlisle, Helena Christensen, and Kym Wilson.

In August 1992, Helena Christensen and Hutchence were riding their bikes at night on a street in Copenhagen when he refused to move for a taxi. They were on push bikes eating pizza when a taxi was, unbeknownst to him, trying to get through the narrow street and "didn't beep its horn or anything" The taxi driver then assaulted him, causing him to fall backwards and hit his head on the roadway. Hutchence suffered a fractured skull in the altercation. Hutchence did not immediately seek medical assistance for the injury, instead waiting several days before seeing a doctor. As a result of the altercation, he was left with brain damage and an almost complete loss of the sense of smell and significant loss of taste. This injury led to periods of depression and increased levels of aggression; he had not fully recovered after two weeks in a Copenhagen hospital. According to INXS bandmate Beers, Hutchence brandished a knife and threatened to kill him during the 1993 recording of Full Moon, Dirty Hearts on the isle of Capri. Beers recalled, "Over those six weeks, Michael threatened or physically confronted nearly every member of the band."

In the mid-1990s, Hutchence became romantically involved with Paula Yates. They met in 1985, during an interview for the British TV program The Tube. Yates interviewed him again in 1994 for her Big Breakfast show, and their affair was soon uncovered by the British press. At the time, Yates was married to the Boomtown Rats singer and Live Aid organiser Bob Geldof. Media scrutiny was intense, and Hutchence assaulted a photographer who had followed them. Yates' separation from Geldof in February 1995 sparked a public and at times bitter custody battle over their daughters. Yates and Geldof divorced in May 1996. On 22 July 1996, Yates gave birth to her daughter with Hutchence.

In September 1996, Yates and Hutchence made headlines when they were arrested for suspicion of drug possession after the family nanny reportedly found a small amount of opium in a shoebox underneath their bed. The case was dropped due to lack of evidence.

Death

Hutchence and INXS went on a world tour to support the April 1997 release of Elegantly Wasted. The final 20th anniversary tour was to occur in Australia in November and December. During the tour, Paula Yates planned to visit Hutchence with their daughter and Yates's three other children, but Bob Geldof had taken legal action to prevent the visit.

On the morning of 22 November 1997, Hutchence, aged 37, was found dead in Room 524 at the Ritz-Carlton hotel in Double Bay, Sydney. Actress Kym Wilson was the last person to see Hutchence alive, when she visited him in his hotel room the previous evening.
Geldof and Yates each gave police statements on the phone calls they exchanged with Hutchence on the morning of his death; however, they did not volunteer their phone records. Yates's statement on 26 November indicated that she had informed Hutchence of the Geldof girls' custody hearing being adjourned until 17 December, which meant that Yates would not be able to bring their daughter and the Geldof girls to Australia for a visit as previously intended. According to Yates, Hutchence "was frightened and couldn't stand a minute more without his baby... [he] was terribly upset and he said, 'I don't know how I'll live without seeing Tiger'". Yates indicated that Hutchence said he was going to phone Geldof "to let the girls come to Australia".

Geldof's police statements and evidence to the coroner indicated he did receive a call from Hutchence, who was "hectoring and abusive and threatening" during their phone conversation. The occupant in the room next to Hutchence's heard a loud male voice and swearing at about 5 am; the coroner was satisfied that this was Hutchence arguing with Geldof.

At 9:54 am on 22 November, Hutchence spoke with a former girlfriend, Michèle Bennett; according to Bennett, Hutchence was crying, sounded upset, and told her he needed to see her. Bennett arrived at his hotel room door at about 10:40 am, but there was no response. Hutchence's body was discovered by a hotel maid at 11:50 am. Police reported that Hutchence was found "in a kneeling position facing the door. He had used his snakeskin belt to tie a knot on the automatic door closure at the top of the door, and had strained his head forward into the loop so hard that the buckle had broken."

On 6 February 1998, after an autopsy and coronial inquest, New South Wales State Coroner, Derrick Hand, presented his report. The report ruled that Hutchence's death was suicide while depressed and under the influence of alcohol and other drugs. "An analysis report of Hutchence's blood [indicated] the presence of alcohol, cocaine, Prozac and prescription drugs." In producing his coroner's report, Hand had specifically considered the suggestions of accidental death (coupled with the fact that Hutchence left no suicide note), but had discounted them based on substantial evidence presented to the contrary. In a 1999 interview on 60 Minutes (and in a documentary film on Channel 4), Yates claimed that Hutchence's death might have resulted from autoerotic asphyxiation; this claim contradicted her previous statements to police investigators and the coroner.

On 27 November 1997, Hutchence's funeral was held at St Andrew's Cathedral, Sydney. His casket was carried out of the cathedral by members of INXS and by his younger brother, Rhett; "Never Tear Us Apart" was played in the background. Nick Cave, a friend of Hutchence's, performed his 1997 song "Into My Arms" during the funeral and requested that television cameras be switched off. Rhett claimed in his 2004 book, Total XS, that on the previous day at the funeral home, Yates had put a gram of heroin into Hutchence's pocket.

Later developments
After Hutchence's death, INXS continued recording and performing until 2012. According to the Recording Industry Association of America (RIAA), INXS has sold 30 million units in the United States alone, making them the second highest-selling Australian music act in the United States, behind AC/DC. INXS has sold over 75 million records worldwide. INXS was inducted into the ARIA Hall of Fame in 2001.

Hutchence's solo album, Michael Hutchence, was released in October 1999. He had started on the album in 1995, recording songs in between INXS sessions; he had last worked on it three days before his death. The last song he recorded was "Possibilities". The album includes "Slide Away", a duet with U2's Bono; Bono's vocals were recorded after Hutchence's death.

The 1999 movie Limp includes a cameo by Hutchence.

On 18 June 2000, Patricia Glassop and Tina Schorr released their book, Just a Man: The Real Michael Hutchence, which has been described as "an odd biography ... [that] combines the basic facts of Hutchence's early life ... with an almost too-intimate view of the authors' feelings".

Paula Yates died on 17 September 2000 of an accidental heroin overdose; she was discovered in the presence of her and Hutchence's then four-year-old daughter. Soon after Yates's death, Bob Geldof assumed foster custody of their daughter so that she could be brought up with her three older half-sisters, Fifi, Peaches and Pixie. In 2007, her and Hutchence's daughter was adopted by Geldof.

On 20 August 2005, Melbourne's The Age reported on the disposition of Hutchence's estate and assets, which, although estimated at between $10 million and $20 million, amounted to virtually nothing. The remainder of his estate had reportedly been sold off or swallowed in legal fees.

A documentary about Hutchence, Michael Hutchence: The Last Rockstar, aired in 2017. In 2019, Mystify: Michael Hutchence—another documentary about Hutchence's life—was released.

Discography

Posthumous albums

Singles

Collaborations and soundtrack appearances
 Freedom Original Motion Picture Soundtrack (1982) – "Speed Kills", "Forest Theme" (with Don Walker of Cold Chisel)
 Flame Fortune (1985) – "Sex Symbol", "Jungle Boy"
  Dogs in Space Original Motion Picture Soundtrack (1987) – "Dogs in Space", "Golf Course", "The Green Dragon", "Rooms for the Memory"
 Symphonic Music of the Rolling Stones (1994) – "Under My Thumb"
 It's Now or Never: The Tribute The Elvis (1994) – "Baby Let's Play House"
 Batman Forever Original Motion Picture Soundtrack (1995) – "The Passenger"
 Barb Wire Original Motion Picture Soundtrack (1996) – "Spill the Wine"
 One Voice: The Songs of Chage & Aska (1996) – "Red Hill"
 No Talking, Just Head (1996) – "The King Is Gone" (The Heads with Michael Hutchence)

Tributes and dedications 
 In 1997, Duran Duran wrote the song "Michael You've Got a Lot to Answer For". The song appeared on their album Medazzaland. Lead singer Simon Le Bon told Q magazine that the song, released shortly before Hutchence's death, was about "Michael being a naughty boy ... when he was living with Paula Yates. He did like his substances."
 Nick Cave sang "Into My Arms" at Hutchence's funeral on 27 November 1997. The funeral was broadcast live on Australian TV. Out of respect, Cave requested the song not be televised.
 Terri Nunn of Berlin and Billy Corgan collaborated on "Sacred and Profane" for Berlin's 2000 album Live: Sacred & Profane. Nunn said, "The song is about my first experience seeing [Hutchence] because that changed my life. He influenced me probably more than anyone else as a performer. I became 12 years old in five minutes wanting to have sex with him. That's all I wanted! Oh my God. Everybody did! You just wanted him. He was the epitome of [a] rock star."
 Bono, a close friend of Hutchence, wrote "Stuck in a Moment You Can't Get Out Of" on the 2000 U2 album All That You Can't Leave Behind. The song is written in the form of an argument about suicide in which he tries to convince Hutchence of its foolishness. Bono characterised the song as a good old row between friends, adding that he felt guilty for never having had it with Hutchence in real life. In a 2005 interview, Bono regretted that he had not spent more time with Hutchence. Bono's wife, Alison Hewson, had seen Hutchence before his death and noted "he looked a bit shaky to [her]".
On 23 November 2019, U2 paid tribute to Hutchence in Sydney, Australia, on their Joshua Tree Tour.

Awards and nominations

APRA Awards
The APRA Awards are presented annually from 1982 by the Australasian Performing Right Association (APRA), "honouring composers and songwriters". They commenced in 1982.

! 
|-
| rowspan="3"| 2021 
| rowspan="3"| "Break My Heart" by Dua Lipa (Andrew Farriss, Michael Hutchence, Dua Lipa, Jordan Johnson, Stefan Johnson, Ali Tamposi, Andrew Watt)
| Song of the Year
| 
|
|-
| Most Performed Pop Work
| 
| rowspan="2"|
|-
| Most Performed Australian Work
| 
|-

Countdown Australian Music Awards
Countdown was an Australian pop music TV series on national broadcaster ABC-TV from 1974 to 1987, it presented music awards from 1979 to 1987, initially in conjunction with magazine TV Week. The TV Week / Countdown Awards were a combination of popular-voted and peer-voted awards.

|-
| rowspan="3" | 1984
| himself (with Andrew Farriss)
| Best Songwriter
| 
|-
| himself
| Most Popular Male Performer
| 
|-
| himself ("Burn for You" by INXS)
| Best Male Performance in a Video
| 
|-
| 1986
| himself 
| Most Popular Male Performer
| 
|-

References

General 

  Note: Archived [on-line] copy has limited functionality.
  Note: On-line version established at White Room Electronic Publishing Pty Ltd in 2007 and was expanded from the 2002 edition. As from September 2010, the on-line version appears to have an Internal Service Error.

Specific

External links 

 Official Michael Hutchence Website
 Michael Hutchence Official Site – created by his mother, Patricia Glassop, and his half-sister Tina Schorr.
 Official Michael Hutchence Memorial Website – created by his father, Kelland Hutchence
 

 
1960 births
1997 deaths
20th-century Australian male actors
APRA Award winners
Male actors from Sydney
Australian people of English descent
Australian people of Irish descent
Alumni of King George V School, Hong Kong
People educated at Davidson High School
Australian baritones
Australian expatriates in Hong Kong
Australian expatriates in the United States
Australian expatriates in England
Australian expatriates in Denmark
Australian male film actors
Brit Award winners
Burials at Forest Lawn Memorial Park (Hollywood Hills)
INXS members
Australian new wave musicians
Singers from Sydney
1997 suicides
Suicides by asphyxiation
Suicides by hanging in New South Wales
Australian rock singers
V2 Records artists
Max Q (Australian band) members
20th-century Australian male singers
People named in the Paradise Papers
People with traumatic brain injuries